William Wilson was a U.S. soccer fullback who spent six seasons in the American Soccer League and earned two caps with the U.S. national team.

American Soccer League
In 1924, Wilson signed with the New Bedford Whalers of the American Soccer League.  While he began the 1926-1927 season with the Whalers, he played only one game, then transferred to the Brooklyn Wanderers.  At the end of the season, he moved to the New York Nationals for the 1927-1928 season.  There is a gap in his career for the next two years which may be accounted for if he played in the Eastern Professional Soccer League.  Regardless, Wilson was back in the ASL in 1930 with the New Bedford Whalers.  He left the ASL permanently in 1931.

National team
His first game with the national team in a 6-1 win over  Canada on November 11, 1925.  His second came almost exactly a year later in a 6-2 win over Canada on November 6, 1926.

References

American soccer players
United States men's international soccer players
American Soccer League (1921–1933) players
New Bedford Whalers players
Brooklyn Wanderers players
New York Nationals (ASL) players
Year of birth missing
Year of death missing
Place of birth missing
Place of death missing
Association football defenders